Lago di Tenno is a lake at Tenno in Trentino, Italy. At an elevation of 550 m, its surface area is 0.25 km². The lake was formed around the year 1100 following a large landslide that blocked the course of the river Rì Sec, which is currently the main tributary of the lake.
In the southern portion of the lake there is a small island. The level of the lake varies over the years depending on the flow rate of the tributaries. In the years when the level is low this island becomes a kind of promontory. This area is protected by the Autonomous Province of Trento as a biotope.

External links

Lakes of Trentino-Alto Adige/Südtirol